Without Orders is a 1936 American drama film directed by Lew Landers and starring Sally Eilers, Robert Armstrong, Frances Sage, Charley Grapewin and Vinton Haworth. It was produced by RKO Radio Pictures, who released the picture on October 23, 1936.  The screenplay was written by Samuel Briskin and Cliff Reid, based on the short story of the same name by Peter B. Kyne, which had appeared in the February 8, 1936 edition of Collier's magazine.

Plot
At Portland, Oregon, playboy pilot Len Kendrick (Vinton Haworth) lands at the end of a cross-country record flight, met by his father J.P. Kendrick (Charley Grapewin) who owns Amalgamated Air Lines. Len is a media darling, adored by fans for his daring flights. He is in love with Amalgamated stewardess Kay Armstrong (Sally Eilers) who is dating veteran pilot "Wad" Madison (Robert Armstrong). Len dates her sister Penny (Frances Sage) who learns that his hard-drinking and recklessness has caused the death of his co-pilot. Penny knows that he was drinking before the fateful flight and only escaped prosecution by bribing a bartender. She leaves Len who ends up at Amalgamated as a line pilot, being tutored by Wad.

Len pursues Kay, and she falls for his charm but asks her sister for advice about marrying him. Realizing that marriage would be a mistake, Penny tells Len that she will expose him; he angrily reacts by knocking her down, fracturing her skull. On an outbound flight, Len attempts to rush Kay into accepting a proposal of marriage but she learns that her sister is seriously injured and in the hospital. Kay asks Wad to fly her back to Portland. On the same flight, Len locks his rival out of the cockpit, takes over the flight and after landing at the airline's home base, accuses Wad of cowardice and dereliction of duty, resulting in a fistfight between the two men. Wad is fired, but finds out from Penny that Len has a terrible secret to hide.

On a flight to Salt Lake City, Len's aircraft not only has been battling a blizzard for hours, but also experiences engine trouble. Instead of landing, in a repeat of the earlier tragic incident, Len knocks out his co-pilot, and again takes to a parachute, leaving Key  and the passengers behind. This time, his parachute fails to open. Wad radios instructions to Kay who takes over the controls and successfully makes an emergency landing. Kay and Wad are hailed as heroes and, after the veteran pilot gets back his old job, take up where they had left off.

Cast

 Sally Eilers as Kay Armstrong
 Robert Armstrong as "Wad" Madison
 Frances Sage as Penny Armstrong
 Charley Grapewin as J.P. Kendrick
 Vinton Hayworth as Len Kendrick
 Ward Bond as Tim Casey
 Frank M. Thomas as Arthur Trueman
 May Boley as Mrs. Maddy Overhose
 Arthur Loft as Air Controller Calkins
 Walter Miller as Commerce Airline Inspector

Production

Without Orders was directed by B-movie specialist Lew Landers, who would eventually helm nine aviation films including Flight from Glory (1937), Sky Giant (1938), Air Hostess (1939) and Arctic Flight (1952). The stars of Without Orders also had appeared in many aviation-themed films, with Sally Eilers starring in three films and Robert Armstrong in eight films.

Without Orders was primarily filmed from August 3 to late-August 1936, at the Grand Central Air Terminal at Glendale, California which stood in for both the Portland and Salt Lake City airports.  The aircraft that was featured as the Amalgamated Air Lines airliner was the first Boeing 247D (NC2666), leased from Philips Petroleum Co. A Ryan ST-A was the aircraft seen as the record-breaking aircraft.

Reception
Without Orders was reviewed by B.R. Crisler at The New York Times. He noted that the film "... deals with that previously celebrated conflict between stunt and transport piloting, nor exactly revolutionary in treatment, 'Without Orders' nonetheless, manages to be endurable and even fairly exciting aero-drama." Aviation film historian James Farmer considered Without Orders, "above average" although the plot was a hackneyed love triangle.

References

Notes

Citations

Bibliography

 Farmer, James H. Celluloid Wings: The Impact of Movies on Aviation. Blue Ridge Summit, Pennsylvania: Tab Books Inc., 1984. .
 Pendo, Stephen. Aviation in the Cinema. Lanham, Maryland: Scarecrow Press, 1985. .

External links

1936 drama films
1936 films
American aviation films
American black-and-white films
Films about aviation accidents or incidents
Films set in airports
Films set on airplanes
Films produced by Cliff Reid
RKO Pictures films
American drama films
1930s English-language films
Films directed by Lew Landers
1930s American films